Oliver Wells may refer to:

 Oliver Wells (Bones), a character on the TV series Bones
 Oliver Elwin Wells (1853–1922), American educator